Javier "Javi" Gracia Carlos (born 1 May 1970) is a Spanish football manager and former player who played as a defensive midfielder. He is the manager of Premier League club Leeds United.

He totalled 430 matches across both major levels of Spanish football, in a 15-year professional career. After retiring he began working as a manager, going on to coach several clubs in Spain, Greece and Russia before being appointed at Watford in January 2018.

Gracia led Watford to their second FA Cup final in their history in 2019, but was sacked later the same year. From June 2020 to May 2021 he worked with Valencia, and a year later he won the Qatar Stars League during a brief spell at Al Sadd before joining Leeds United in February 2023.

Playing career
Born in Pamplona, Navarre, Gracia started playing professionally with Bilbao Athletic, Athletic Bilbao's reserves, never appearing officially for the first team. In the 1992–93 campaign, he scored a career-best 12 goals in all 38 games as UE Lleida returned to La Liga after an absence of more than 40 years, as champions.

Gracia spent the following six seasons in the top flight, appearing regularly for both Real Valladolid and Real Sociedad until 1998–99 (15 matches, one goal). In 1999, he returned to the Segunda División and signed for Villarreal CF, helping the Valencian club to get promoted to the top division after one year and being regularly used the following campaign – 1,765 minutes of action – as the team retained their division status.

In February 2003, after being scarcely played in his last one and a half seasons at Villarreal, the 32-year-old Gracia joined Córdoba CF in the second level, closing out his career in June of the following year. He appeared in 229 Spanish top-tier games over the course of nine seasons, netting 17 goals.

Coaching career

Early years
After starting his managerial career with the youth sides of his former club Villarreal, Gracia worked in the Segunda División B with Pontevedra CF, finishing first and second with the team in the regular season but always falling short in the promotion playoffs.

In 2008–09, still in the third division, Gracia finally achieved promotion, now with Cádiz CF, but he was fired midway through the following season as the Andalusians were immediately relegated. In the 2010–11 campaign, with Villarreal's reserves, he managed to avert a drop also in the second tier.

Greece
In June 2011, Gracia was hired by Olympiacos Volos FC, who had finished fifth in the Super League Greece. He debuted with the first European fixtures of his managerial career, eliminating FK Rad and FC Differdange 03 from the UEFA Europa League qualifiers, but the team were then expelled from the top flight and European competition due to their alleged involvement in the Koriopolis match-fixing scandal. 

Having terminated his contract, Gracia remained in the same league for the rest of 2011–12 season at A.O. Kerkyra. He took the Corfu-based club to the last eight of the national cup, where they lost by a single goal at Asteras Tripolis FC.

Almería
Gracia returned to his country in June 2012, being hired by UD Almería. He led the team back to the top flight in his one season, but left in June after failing to agree new terms.

Osasuna
On 4 September 2013, Gracia was appointed at his hometown club CA Osasuna on a two-year deal, replacing the fired José Luis Mendilibar. On his top-flight debut 11 days later, he lost 2–1 at Getafe CF. His team were relegated in 18th place on the last day, ending 14 years in the top division, despite winning 2–1 against already condemned Real Betis; results included heavy defeats against his former teams and rivals  Real Sociedad and Athletic Bilbao and a 7–0 loss at FC Barcelona, but also a 3–0 home win over reigning champions Atlético Madrid on 23 February 2014.

Málaga
Gracia was named the new manager of Málaga CF on 30 May 2014. During his two-year tenure, he led the team to the ninth and eighth position, respectively.

Rubin Kazan

Before the start of the 2016–17 season, Gracia joined FC Rubin Kazan. After only achieving a ninth-place finish in the Russian Premier League, he left the club by mutual consent.

Watford
On 21 January 2018, Gracia was named the new head coach of Watford on an 18-month contract following the dismissal of Marco Silva. His first game in charge took place six days later, in a 1–0 away loss against Southampton in the fourth round of the FA Cup.

In the 2018–19 campaign, Gracia again coached the team to safety in the Premier League, also taking them to the final of the FA Cup for the first time in 35 years, and for only the second time in the club's history. He was sacked on 7 September 2019, after a poor start to the season saw them bottom with just one point.

Valencia
Gracia returned to Spain's top division on 27 July 2020, agreeing to a two-year deal at Valencia CF. The following 3 May, after a 3–2 home defeat to Barcelona that left the side in 14th place, he was dismissed.

Al Sadd
On 7 December 2021, Gracia was hired by Al Sadd SC in the Qatar Stars League, after his compatriot Xavi had left for Barcelona; he signed until 2023 with the option of one more year. The following 21 February, the team retained their title with an 8–2 win over Al Ahli SC. He then left and was replaced by a third Spaniard, Juan Manuel Lillo.

Leeds United
On 21 February 2023, Gracia returned to England and its top flight after replacing the sacked Jesse Marsch at the helm of Leeds United. The club announced the contract would be "flexible" but did not elaborate on that statement, further saying Gracia's appointment would be subject to the issuance of a work permit. His debut took place four days later, a 1–0 home win over Southampton.

Personal life
Gracia's parents were both teachers. He is married with three sons, two of whom are twins.

Managerial statistics

Honours

Player
Lleida
Segunda División: 1992–93

Manager
Pontevedra
Segunda División B: 2006–07

Cádiz
Segunda División B: 2008–09

Watford
FA Cup runner-up: 2018–19

Al Sadd
Qatar Stars League: 2021–22

Individual
Premier League Manager of the Month: August 2018

Notes

References

External links

1970 births
Living people
Spanish footballers
Footballers from Pamplona
Association football midfielders
La Liga players
Segunda División players
Bilbao Athletic footballers
Athletic Bilbao footballers
UE Lleida players
Real Valladolid players
Real Sociedad footballers
Villarreal CF players
Córdoba CF players
Spain youth international footballers
Spain under-21 international footballers
Spanish football managers
La Liga managers
Segunda División managers
Segunda División B managers
Pontevedra CF managers
Cádiz CF managers
Villarreal CF B managers
UD Almería managers
CA Osasuna managers
Málaga CF managers
Valencia CF managers
Super League Greece managers
Olympiacos Volos F.C. managers
A.O. Kerkyra managers
Russian Premier League managers
FC Rubin Kazan managers
Premier League managers
Watford F.C. managers
Leeds United F.C. managers
Qatar Stars League managers
Al Sadd SC managers
Spanish expatriate football managers
Expatriate football managers in Greece
Expatriate football managers in Russia
Expatriate football managers in England
Expatriate football managers in Qatar
Spanish expatriate sportspeople in Greece
Spanish expatriate sportspeople in Russia
Spanish expatriate sportspeople in England
Spanish expatriate sportspeople in Qatar
Villarreal CF non-playing staff